William Batecumbe or Badecumbe (fl. 1348) was an English mathematician and astrologer. His work is largely lost: some works of later authors have been attributed to him.

Life
Batecumbe was at the University of Oxford, where he was magister.

Works
Batecumbe produced a 1348 edition of the Alphonsine tables. Tabula mediorum motuum Planetarum in annis collectis et expansis, composita a magistro Batecombe, a manuscript preserved in the library of Magdalen College, Oxford, and a manuscript listed a formerly belonging to John Dee and named "Tabulæ Latitudinum secundum Bachecombe", are taken to be derived works.

De Sphæræ concavæ fabrica et usu, a copy of which was seen by John Bale in the library of Robert Recorde, and De Sphæra solida, are late attributions.

References

Attribution

Year of birth missing
Year of death missing
14th-century English writers
14th-century English mathematicians
Alumni of the University of Oxford
14th-century astrologers
14th-century Latin writers